Live at Bush Hall is a concert film by British rock band Black Country, New Road released on 20 February 2023 through YouTube. It is the first official release since Ants From Up There and the departure of Isaac Wood, the band's vocalist, and consists of recordings from previously unreleased music performed live at Bush Hall, London, over the period of 15-16 December 2022.

Background and performance
On 31 January 2022, four days prior to the release of Ants From Up There, Black Country, New Road's vocalist, Isaac Wood announced that he was departing the band due to mental health. This resulted in the band cancelling their upcoming tour in North America and beginning work on new music they could perform without him. They continued to perform gigs as they felt they had to "keep momentum", or it would have "felt like [they] were quitting music". Over the following months, the band wrote new music. The band did not intend on creating a new full-length album at the time, so the tracks were written with the specific intent to be performed live. Lewis Evans, who was now acting as one of the band's vocalists alongside being the saxophonist, said that they wanted to release a live performance to act as a "little time capsule of these eight months that we’ve had playing these songs on the road". Luke Mark, the guitarist, wanted to avoid the problems he noticed in previous live performances. Specifically, he wanted to avoid the recording appearing disingenuous by making the cuts between performances obvious, rather than attempting to disguise them.

To accomplish this, the band constructed a unique theme for each of the three live sessions: "When The Whistle Thins", which was farming themed; "I Ain't Alfredo No Ghosts", pizza and restaurant themed; and "The Taming Of The School", 1980s prom night themed. Combined, this resulted in obvious cuts between songs, showing that they "didn't want to just do this completely perfect thing" according to Evans. According to drummer Charlie Wayne, they wanted the "focal point to be this film. We've put a lot of effort into making it feel like you're watching a live gig. It's not an album in our eyes, it's a live performance".

Release
Black Country, New Road posted a short teaser on their social media for something "coming soon", scheduled for release on 20 February. It was then announced to be a recording of their performances at Bush Hall, London, premiering on YouTube. There was also a special screening the same night of the release at the Institute of Contemporary Arts.

A CD of the performance is due for release on 24 March 2023 through Ninja Tune.

Setlist
"Up Song"
"The Boy"
"I Won't Always Love You"
"Across the Pond Friend"
"Laughing Song"
"The Wrong Trousers"
"Turbines"
"Dancers"
"Up Song (Reprise)"

Personnel

Musicians
 Charlie Wayne - drums, backing vocals
 Georgia Ellery - violin, backing vocals
 Lewis Evans - saxophone, flute, vocals (4, 6)
 Luke Mark - guitar, backing vocals
 May Kershaw - piano, accordion, vocals (2, 7)
 Tyler Hyde - bass, vocals (1, 3, 5, 8, 9)

Technical
 Greg Barnes - directing, editing
 John Parish - mixing
 Oliver Baldwin - assistant mixer
 Jordan Hayward - recording, engineering
 Christian Wright - mastering

Filmography
 Jack Maddison - director of photography
 Rowan Biddiscombe - camera operator
 Stephan Knight - camera operator
 Emily McNey - camera assistant
 Sebastian Olmos - camera assistant
 Francis Albrecht - lighting design
 Kev Corry - editing
 Cheat Studio - colour grading
 Neil Goody - sound mixing

Additional Footage
 Ginny Davies
 Maxwell Tait
 Claire Evans
 Tony Fagg
 Jack Sheppard
 Cameron Picton
 Lucas Lockeridge
 Mika Hyde
 Basil Tierney
 Luna Wang
 Josh Knox

Other
 Rosalind Murray - artwork
 Ginny Davies - show programmes
 India Hogan - show programmes

References

External links

Black Country, New Road albums
2023 in music
2023 in film
Concert films
Live albums by English artists